The Uzbekistan women's national handball team is the national team of Uzbekistan. It takes part in international handball competitions. 

The team participated in the 1997 World Women's Handball Championship, placing 21st.

Results

World Championship
 1997 – 21st
 2021 – 30th

Asian Championship
 1997 – 4th
 2002 – 7th
 2008 – 9th
 2010 – 6th
 2012 – 6th
 2015 – 5th
 2017 – 5th
 2021 – 5th
 2022 – 8th

Current squad
Squad for the 2021 World Women's Handball Championship.

Head coach: Zafar Azimov

References

External links
IHF profile

Women's national handball teams
Handball
National team